Canada has adopted the NTSC and ATSC television transmission standards without any alterations. However, some unique local variations exist for DTH television because of  transponder design variation in the Anik series of satellites.
Television in Canada has many individual stations and networks and systems.

Networks list
All of the networks listed below operate a number of terrestrial TV stations. In addition, several of these networks are also aired on cable and satellite services.

English-language networks

French-language networks

Educational networks

Multicultural networks

Defunct television systems

See also 
 List of television stations in Canada by call sign
 List of Canadian television channels
 List of Canadian specialty channels
 Category A services
 Category B services
 Category C services
 List of foreign television channels available in Canada
 List of United States stations available in Canada
 Digital television in Canada
 Multichannel television in Canada
 List of Canadian stations available in the United States
 List of television stations in North America by media market

Notes

 
Networks
 
 
Networks